Kevin Patrick Blackwell (born 21 December 1958) is an English former professional football goalkeeper who since retiring as a player has worked as a coach and a manager. He was most recently the manager of Thai League 1 club Nakhon Ratchasima.

Early career
Blackwell was born in Luton and began his football career as an apprentice at Cambridge United, with Ron Atkinson as his manager. After failing to make the grade at the Abbey Stadium, he moved into Non-League football, playing for Bedford Town while working as a bricklayer. He later played in the 1978 FA Vase final for Barton Rovers and for Middlesex Wanderers before being signed by Barnet.

In 1980, he moved to Boston United for a fee of £5,000, saving a penalty at Wembley in the 1985 FA Trophy final. He returned to Barnet in 1986 before Neil Warnock signed him for Scarborough in November the same year.

That season saw Scarborough promoted to the Football League and Blackwell remained at the club for their first two league seasons, making 44 league appearances in addition to those made in the Conference. Warnock moved to Notts County in January 1989, and in November of that year he returned to Scarborough to sign Blackwell for £15,000. In just over 3 years at Meadow Lane, Blackwell never made a league appearance, and in January 1993, when Warnock took over at Torquay United, Blackwell followed him, playing 18 league games in a successful battle to stay in the Football League.

Coaching
At the end of the season, Warnock moved to Huddersfield Town and in August 1993, Blackwell once again joined him, this time taking on coaching duties in addition to his playing role. His playing opportunities were limited to three full league appearances, plus another two as a substitute.

In August 1995, Blackwell followed Warnock to Plymouth Argyle on a free transfer and was appointed player-youth coach. Warnock left in February 1997, but Blackwell remained at Argyle, working as assistant manager to Mick Jones. He remained registered as a player, solely as a precautionary measure, but in March 1998 returned to full-time training as emergency cover for Argyle's only keeper Jon Sheffield. He was never called upon and ended his career after 24 league appearances for Argyle.

In June 1998, Jones was sacked after Plymouth's relegation, and a month later Blackwell also left with new manager Kevin Hodges wanting to appoint his own management team, which was understandable given how well Hodges and Steve McCall had worked together at Torquay United the previous season.

By now Neil Warnock was manager of Bury, and Blackwell was soon appointed goalkeeping coach at Bury, eventually becoming assistant manager. In October 1998, Blackwell found himself making headlines from an incident that had happened during his time at Huddersfield. He was taken to court by the family of a girl whose arm was broken by one of his stray shots during the warm-up. Soon after Torquay chairman Mike Bateson banned his own players from shooting at the goals during the pre-match warm up and the case was delayed so an out of court settlement could be reached.

In December 1999, Neil Warnock was appointed manager of Sheffield United and took Blackwell with him as his assistant. In September 2000, Blackwell's thoughts were turned to playing again, he was still registered as a player and due to injuries was the only cover for the Blades' first choice keeper.

In August 2014 Blackwell was reunited with Neil Warnock at Crystal Palace. Working together for the first time in eleven years, Blackwell being appointed a Technical Director. Blackwell was asked to continue his role after Warnock had departed until the appointment of Alan Pardew.

In February 2015 Blackwell started coaching at Barnet, helping Martin Allen with the Bees' title push in the Conference Premier until the end of the season.

In November 2015 Blackwell was brought in by Warnock, then interim manager at Queens Park Rangers, to assist him at the club.

In February 2016, Blackwell was appointed assistant manager to Warnock at Rotherham United along with Ronnie Jepson. The management team left Rotherham in May of the same year, having guided the club to safety in the Championship.

In October 2016, Blackwell again teamed up with Warnock and Jepson, as assistant manager at Cardiff City and also worked alongside the duo at Middlesbrough between June 2020 and November 2021.

In March 2022, he accepted to be head coach of Nakhon Ratchasima F.C.

Management

Leeds United
Blackwell left Sheffield United for Leeds United to join Peter Reid as his Assistant Manager in 2003. He remained in this role under Eddie Gray following Reid's dismissal before taking over as manager of Leeds in the summer 2004 following the club's relegation from the Premiership. Handed the task of rebuilding Leeds' team after huge debts forced the jettisoning of its highly paid stars, Blackwell made a record number of signings for the club in 2004–05. He focused on value for money, buying players that, while talented, had not made the highest grade. Although early results were poor, perhaps affected by boardroom turmoil that saw the new board struggle to put the club onto a sound financial footing and in time led to its takeover by Ken Bates, Blackwell led the side to challenge for the playoffs, before a run of draws slowed progress, leaving Leeds in mid-table.

Blackwell had been seen as a temporary appointment, perhaps to be replaced by a more glamorous name, but his success in stabilising the team – and his initial popularity with fans – led Bates to suggest he had a long-term future at the club.

In the summer of 2005 Blackwell was given financial backing and bought some high-profile players for the new season. Proven strikers Richard Cresswell, Rob Hulse and Robbie Blake gave Blackwell plenty of firepower up front, while USA winger Eddie Lewis arrived to supply the ammunition. Once again Blackwell had convinced in-demand players to join Leeds. Blackwell's shrewd tactics away from Elland Road and attacking style at home (where 9 out of 10 matches were won) proved very effective and, by the end of February, Blackwell had guided Leeds to 3rd spot and an almost guaranteed play off spot, with automatic promotion remaining a possibility. The Leeds team, however, then produced some distinctly average performances and settled for their play-off place.

Blackwell took his Leeds team into the Championship play-off final, after beating Preston North End 3–1 on aggregate in the semi-finals. However, Leeds lost the final 3–0 to Watford on 21 May 2006. A string of bad results followed in both pre-season and the start of the 2006–07 and on 20 September 2006 his contract as Leeds United manager was terminated. As Blackwell left the club, Leeds were lying 23rd in the table, with seven points from eight games.

After leaving Leeds, Blackwell travelled around Europe going to big-name clubs such as Real Madrid and Internazionale acquiring knowledge of further training techniques to help him with his management career. On 20 November 2006, he announced he was suing Leeds United for wrongful dismissal after it was confirmed he was sacked for gross misconduct on the grounds of "negative comments made in the press about the club's finances".

Luton Town

On 27 March 2007, Blackwell was announced as the new manager of Luton Town and began his tenure with a draw against Burnley. Luton were already in the bottom 3 when Blackwell took over and were 9 points from safety with 3 games to go. Blackwell set about rebuilding the side, his priority to get in some experience. To achieve this he sold centre back Leon Barnett to West Bromwich Albion, and defender Kevin Foley to Wolves, as well as releasing centre-back Russ Perrett and £500,000 signing Adam Boyd, who went on to score 14 goals that season for Leyton Orient. He also lost Markus Heikkinen on a free transfer. In replacement he brought in high-profile players such as Paul Peschisolido, Chris Perry, Don Hutchison, Paul McVeigh and Paul Furlong. He also signed some younger players in Alan Goodall, Richard Jackson and Dave Edwards.

The club entered administration in late 2007, and in January 2008 Blackwell announced he would leave Luton after working a month's notice. However, he was sacked a week after making this statement.

Sheffield United

Blackwell, took the position of Sheffield United manager replacing Bryan Robson on 14 February 2008 until the end of the season. He was assisted by his former Luton Town assistant Sam Ellis.

After the Blades 2–0 defeat at home to Charlton Athletic on 1 March 2008, Blackwell was critical of his team's performance, describing it as "insipid" and "embarrassing" in an interview on BBC Radio Sheffield. Since then, the team went on a five-game unbeaten run drawing at Ipswich Town and winning four in a row against Plymouth Argyle, Coventry City, Norwich City and Barnsley to improve his chances of landing the job permanently. The 4-match winning streak ended to a 3–1 defeat against Preston North End. The team responded with a 3–0 victory against Leicester City, James Beattie scored his first hat-trick of the club in that game. In his first Sheffield derby as manager, the Blades showed much improved passion levels as they came from 2–0 down against Sheffield Wednesday to draw 2–2 with Beattie scoring a stunning free kick very late in the game to rescue a point. This was followed by a 2–1 victory at Burnley, with another superb Beattie free kick, and a 2–0 victory over Hull when United went down to ten men after skipper Chris Morgan was sent off. In the penultimate game of the season, the Blades won 2–1 against Bristol City with Speed scoring a brace. With one game remaining in the season, United remained in with a chance of making the play offs, a considerable achievement after the Robson era. Sheffield United lost 3–2 on the last day of the season against Southampton and finished ninth, four points off the final playoff place.

In the 2008–2009 season Blackwell took Sheffield United to The Championship play off final after beating Preston North End 2–1 over two legs. Sheffield United lost the final 1–0 against Burnley.

On 14 August 2010 after losing 3–0 to Queens Park Rangers, the club website confirmed that Blackwell had left the club by mutual consent.

Bury

It was announced on 26 September 2012 that the board had hired Kevin Blackwell as permanent manager. Blackwell had previously managed at Leeds United and Sheffield United, and his appointment was widely regarded as something of a coup for Bury. Blackwell began his tenure with a 2–2 draw at Stevenage followed by a 1–0 home loss to Swindon Town prompting him to blast some of his players as 'garbage'. After being winless in his first five games in charge of Bury before they beat Hartlepool United 2–1 to earn their first win of the season, the result sparked a run of form which saw Blackwell's side lose only once in eight games in all competitions, a spell which included five victories. Bury were a point clear of the relegation zone by the end of November, a remarkable turnaround from being seven points adrift when Blackwell took over. In mid December the club was placed under a transfer embargo due to falling into financial difficulty as a result of poor attendance figures. This led to numerous players being released and loaned out to keep the club solvent which ultimately crippled the playing side of the club. As the season wore on Bury F.C were not able to fill a team sheet leading to the last few games with only twelve players available. Bury were officially relegated from league one on Saturday 13 April 2013 after losing at home 1–0 to Oldham Athletic following a late Matt Smith header.

As a manager

References

External links
 
 
 
Full Managerial Stats for Leeds United from WAFLL

1958 births
Living people
Footballers from Luton
English footballers
Association football goalkeepers
Bedford Town F.C. players
Barton Rovers F.C. players
Middlesex Wanderers A.F.C. players
Barnet F.C. players
Boston United F.C. players
Scarborough F.C. players
Notts County F.C. players
Torquay United F.C. players
Huddersfield Town A.F.C. players
Plymouth Argyle F.C. players
Sheffield United F.C. players
Huddersfield Town A.F.C. non-playing staff
Notts County F.C. non-playing staff
Plymouth Argyle F.C. non-playing staff
Leeds United F.C. non-playing staff
Barnet F.C. non-playing staff
English football managers
Leeds United F.C. managers
Luton Town F.C. managers
Sheffield United F.C. managers
Bury F.C. managers
Crystal Palace F.C. non-playing staff
Cardiff City F.C. non-playing staff
Middlesbrough F.C. non-playing staff
People educated at Cardinal Newman Catholic School, Luton